Thiruttu Payale is a 2006 Indian Tamil-language black comedy thriller film written and directed by Susi Ganesan.  The movie stars Kaakha Kaakha fame Jeevan, Sonia Agarwal, Abbas, Malavika, Vivek, Manoj K. Jayan, Gaayathri and Charle. The film's music is composed by music director, Bharadwaj.  Thiruttu Payale was a box office success. The film was remade in Hindi by the director himself as Shortcut Romeo with Neil Nitin Mukesh in the title role with Puja Gupta and Ameesha Patel. The film was also remade in Telugu and Kannada as Mr. Rascal and Aadu Aata Aadu respectively.

Plot
Manickam belongs to a poor family in a village. He does not respect any of his family members, except for his uncle Manohar, who lives in Chennai. The story gets rolling once he decides to come and stay with Manohar at Chennai. Once, while Manickam is watching people playing golf, he notices Roopini and Ramesh having an illicit relationship. He manages to capture the scene in his video camera. Roopini is the wife of a rich businessman named Sivaraj, who is Ramesh's best friend. Manickam blackmails Roopini and extracts money from her whenever he needs. Once, he makes a trip abroad to Australia with Roopini’s expenditure. There, he happens to meet Rosy. He falls in love with her. Rosy tells him that she is a very rich girl from a respected family. While he decides to propose to her, he finds that she has left the city. He is upset, and just at that time, Roopini makes a phone call and tells him that Rosy was sent by her only to woo Manickam and demands that if he needs Rosy, he needs to hand over the cassette to her. Manickam decides to find Rosy and learns that she also loves him. She asks him to leave this con work and gets him a job in a shop. All went well until when Rosy's stepmother learns about this relationship and asks Manickam for a sum if he wants to marry Rosy. To acquire the same, he again uses the cassette for the final time, but Sivaraj learns about it. Manickam hands over the money to Rosy's stepmother and asks Rosy to come to the airport next day. The climax shows Sivaraj killing Ramesh and Manickam fighting the goons sent by Sivaraj and reaching the airport, somehow only to be killed by Sivaraj. The film ends with Rosy waiting for Manickam in the airport.

Cast

Soundtrack
The song "Thiruttu Payale" is partially based on "Chinna Payale" from Arasilankumari (1961).

Release
S. Sudha of Rediff gave the film a rating of two out of five stars and said "Susi Ganesan must be credited for tackling a bold subject. A film for the multiplexes, this".

Box office
 The film was a commercial success grossing  400 million at the box office and became the third highest grossing Tamil film of 2006 only behind Varalaru and Vettaiyaadu Vilaiyaadu.

See also
 Thiruttu Payale 2

References

External links
 AGS Entertainment Website

2006 films
2000s Tamil-language films
Films about adultery in India
Indian thriller films
Films scored by Bharadwaj (composer)
Tamil films remade in other languages
Films directed by Susi Ganeshan
2006 thriller films